U.S. Recanatese is an Italian association football club, based in Recanati, Marche.

History 
The club was founded in 1923. They played almost exclusively in the amateur leagues in Italy throughout their history, except for a short-lived appearance in Serie C during the 1947–48 season.

On 8 May 2022, Recanatese mathematically won the 2021–22 Serie D Group F title following a win against Matese, thus ensuring themselves a spot in the 2022–23 Serie C season, and a first appearance in the Italian third tier after 74 years of absence.

Colors and badge 
The team's colors are yellow and red.

Current squad

Out on loan

References

External links 
 

Football clubs in Italy
Association football clubs established in 1923
Football clubs in the Marche
1923 establishments in Italy
Serie C clubs
Serie D clubs